Migoplastis alba is a moth of the subfamily Arctiinae, first described by Frederic Moore in 1877. It is found in Sri Lanka.

Description
Hindwing of male excised, folded and lobed at anal angle. The branches of antennae shorter. Head and thorax yellowish white in color. Vertex of head with a black dot. The spots on thorax as in Paraplastis hampsoni except pair of spots on pro-thorax found in M. alba. Abdomen yellow with a series of dorsal black bands and two paired series of lateral spots. Forewings are pure white. Hindwings with a slight fuscous tinged. Hindwing with veins 6 and 7 arise from cell. Ventral side is fuscous.

References

 

Arctiini
Moths of Sri Lanka
Moths described in 1877